Bankstown Basketball Stadium is an Australian basketball centre in Bankstown, New South Wales. The eight-court arena was the home of NBL side Bankstown Bruins until 1985 before renaming West Sydney Westars and returned in 1988.

Sports venues in Sydney
Basketball venues in Australia
Defunct National Basketball League (Australia) venues